District School No. 1 may refer to:

District School No. 1 (Bethlehem, New York), listed on the National Register of Historic Places in Albany County, New York
District School No. 1 (Panton, Vermont), listed on the National Register of Historic Places in Addison County, Vermont
District School No. 1 (Shelby, Wisconsin), listed on the National Register of Historic Places in La Crosse County, Wisconsin